The 2011 World Wushu Championships was the 11th edition of the World Wushu Championships. It was held at the Ankara Arena in Ankara, Turkey from October 9 to October 14, 2011. This competition was also the qualifier for the 2013 World Combat Games and the 2013 World Games.

Medal summary

Medal table

Men's taolu

Men's sanda

Women's taolu

Women's sanda

References



World Wushu Championships
Wushu Championships
World Wushu Championships
2011
Wushu in Turkey
2011 in wushu (sport)